Kandkot railway station is located in Kandhkot, Sindh, Pakistan.

See also
 List of railway stations in Pakistan
 Pakistan Railways
 Ministry of Railways (Pakistan)

References

External links

Railway stations in Kashmore District
Railway stations on Kotri–Attock Railway Line (ML 2)